Danka Kovinić was the defending champion, but she lost in the first round to Tessah Andrianjafitrimo.

María Teresa Torró Flor won the title, defeating Jana Čepelová in the final, 6–1, 6–0.

Seeds 

 1 Pereira was defaulted after the first set for throwing her racquet into the crowd

Main draw

Finals

Top half

Bottom half

References 
 Main draw

Open Engie Saint-Gaudens Midi-Pyrénées - Singles